Omphalora is a genus of lichenized fungi in the family Parmeliaceae. The genus is monotypic, containing the single species Omphalora arizonica, found in North America.

References

Parmeliaceae
Lichen genera
Monotypic Lecanorales genera
Taxa described in 1990
Taxa named by Thomas Hawkes Nash III
Taxa named by Josef Hafellner